Giant Manufacturing Co. Ltd. (commonly known as Giant) is a Taiwanese bicycle manufacturer, recognized as the world's largest bicycle designer and manufacturer. Giant has manufacturing facilities in Taiwan, the Netherlands, China, and Hungary.

History

Giant was established in 1972 in Dajia, Taichung County in Taiwan (now part of Taichung City), by King Liu and several friends. A major breakthrough came in 1977 when Giant's chief executive, Tony Lo, negotiated a deal with Schwinn to begin manufacturing bikes as an OEM, manufacturing bicycles to be sold exclusively under other brand names as a private label. As bike sales increased in the U.S., and after workers at the Schwinn plant in Chicago went on strike in 1980, Giant became a key supplier, making more than two-thirds of Schwinn bikes by the mid-1980s, representing 75% of Giant's sales. When Schwinn decided to find a new source and in 1987 signed a contract with the China Bicycle Company to produce bikes in Shenzhen, Giant, under new president Bill Austin (formerly vice-president marketing at Schwinn), established its own brand of bicycles to compete in the rapidly expanding $200-and-above price range. In 1984, Giant also set up a joint venture, "Giant Europe", with Andries Gaastra of Dutch bicycle manufacturer Koga-Miyata. In 1992, Gaastra sold his shares back, and Giant became a full shareholder of Giant Europe.

By 2018, Giant had sales in over 50 countries, in more than 12,000 retail stores. Its total annual sales in 2017 reached 6.6 million bicycles with revenue of US$1.9 billion.

Most of its merchandise is destined for the European Union, the United States, Japan and Taiwan.

COVID-19 pandemic 
With the coronavirus pandemic, the demand for Giant's bikes has skyrocketed. Bicycle manufacturing skyrocketed in Taiwan, fueled by global demand sparked by fear of contracting the coronavirus on crowded buses and trains in Europe or America, or by the need for outdoor activities after weeks of confinement. With this increase in demand, Giant is planning to build a new large plant in the European Union. In addition, the company is moving factories from China to Taiwan.

COVID-19's impact on the bicycle industry is evidenced by a 55% increase in Giant's revenue in the first quarter of 2021. E-bikes have accounted for 30% of sales.

Sub-brands

Mosh BMX 
In 1996, Giant established their Mosh BMX division with the help of Redline Bicycles founder Linn Kastan and racer Jason Richardson. Mosh manufactured BMX bikes and parts, as well as managed a professional BMX racing team. In 2002 Giant signed a three-year sponsorship deal with Satellite Sports Group (a company that then managed the former GT Air Show) to begin manufacturing Giant branded bikes to boost the Giant label. These bikes were priced between $150 to $350, filling in the open entry level price gap that their Mosh labeled high-end bikes could not. Giant made bikes using the Mosh name until 2003 when it switched to labeling all high end stunt specific parts as Mosh parts. The parts were sold separately as well as on Giant labeled BMX bikes. In 2008, Mosh was disbanded.

Liv 
In 2008 Giant launched the Liv/Giant sub-brand with products focused exclusively on the female cycling market. 

In 2014, the Liv/Giant sub-brand was re-branded to Liv. The re-branding was meant to further differentiate the Liv brand products with existing Giant product, communicating the concept of "designed by women for women". All Liv products are designed from the ground up including frame geometry, carbon layup and utilizes separate molds and designs that separate it from Giant branded products. As part of the rebranding, dedicated Liv stores and Liv zones within most Giant retailers were introduced.

Momentum 
In 2015, Giant announced the global launch of its Momentum brand lifestyle bikes. The first two models, the iNeed Street and iWant Park, had an ARP of US$425 and were aimed at a younger, more urban demographic than Giant's more expensive performance road and mountain bikes.

Cadex 
In July 2019, Giant launched CADEX, previously the name of their mass-produced carbon fiber bicycle launched in 1987, as their line of bicycle components, wheels, tires and finishing kits. Before the brand was officially launched, UCI WorldTeam teams sponsored by Giant (Team Sunweb on 2018, and CCC Pro Team on 2019) were seen with components branded as #Overachieve, which Giant says were race-tested prototypes of the CADEX components. This line was designed to "develop superior cycling components for pro racers" and compete directly with the Specialized S-Works line.

Technologies and innovations

In 1987, Giant introduced the CADEX carbon fiber road bike. Giant became the first bicycle maker to apply computer-aided design and volume production techniques to the production of carbon road bikes.

In 1995, Giant designed the first road bicycle with a sloping top tube featuring a smaller rear triangle. The tighter chainstay-seatstay configuration is said to be inherently stiffer than a more conventional frame design, and because less material is used, the Compact Road design is also said to be lighter. With more responsive cornering and improved acceleration, as well as improved aerodynamics, the Giant design became largely imitated.

By 1998, with Mike Burrows, Giant refined the design for racing by the professional ONCE team. This was only after initial resistance by the Union Cycliste Internationale and subsequent amendment to its regulations to allow for bicycles with a sloping top tube.

Giant road frames were originally made of 6061 (ALUXX) aluminium alloy and were also characterized by bladed forks and seat posts to reduce air resistance. Frames came in three sizes (small, medium, and large), with riders fitted through the use of stems and seat posts of different lengths. By 2018, Giant road frames were available in up to six sizes (X-Small, Small, Medium, Medium/Large, Large and X-Large).

In 2003, the Total Compact Road (TCR) frame was offered in carbon fiber construction and marketed as the TCR Composite range. In 2006, Giant added a higher-grade carbon fiber frame marketed as the TCR Advanced frame, which was characterized by an integrated seat post (ISP). These frames were most notably raced at the Tour de France by T-Mobile's professional team. Using this design, the seat post on the new frame must be cut precisely to fit the owner by a trained Giant dealer. The TCR Advanced SL frames with ISP continued to be raced internationally, most notably by the Rabobank team (2009-2013), Team Giant-Shimano (2014), Giant-Alpecin (2015–2016) and Team Sunweb (2017-2018).

In terms of other innovations, Giant also introduced its Maestro suspension in 2006. Maestro Suspension, according to Giant, is designed to deliver an efficient rear suspension power transfer. Maestro utilizes a setup of four pivot points and two linkages to create a floating pivot point that is designed to reduce pedal bob and enables the rear wheel to travel vertically.

As of 2020, Giant categorizes its bicycles by user:
 On-Road
 X-Road 
 Off-Road
 E-bikes
 Youth

Within each Level are several Uses, such as Race, Endurance, City, Cruiser, etc.

In late 2016, Giant announced the Road-E+ e-Bike, which features:
 HCT (Hybrid Cycling Technology) drive system
 500 watt 80Nm Yamaha mid drive motor
 400Wh or 500Wh EnergyPack integrated frame battery
 PedalPlus 4-sensor technology
 RideControl display & control pad with Bluetooth integration.
E-Bikes have become an increasingly popular type of bike of late. They now come in many different offerings, just like Giant offers with their normal bikes. The main three types are sorted into categories which are: Electric Road Bikes, Electric Mountain Bikes, Electric Adventure Bikes.

Sponsorships

Giant's first foray into professional road cycling was with the defunct Spanish Team ONCE directed by Manolo Saiz using Giant TCR frames in custom sizes for each individual rider. Laurent Jalabert was one of the most notable cyclists in the ONCE Team.

Giant currently sponsors a number of cycling teams as well as individual athletes.

In road cycling, Giant celebrated multiple achievements as the bike supplier of UCI WorldTeam Team Sunweb (both men and women), which competes in the highest level of road cycling. They are most noted for when both men and women teams won the Team Time Trial event at the 2017 UCI World Championships in Bergen, Norway. Notable riders include Tom Dumoulin, winner of the pink jersey in the 2017 Giro d'Italia; Warren Barguil, winner of the polka-dot jersey in the 2017 Tour de France, and Michael Mathews, winner of the green jersey in the 2017 Tour de France.

In 2019, Giant switched sponsorship from Team Sunweb to CCC Pro Team.

Giant also sponsors many individual teams and athletes who range from ex-pros to current world champions. 

Kristian Blummenfelt is arguably Giant's most popular sponsored athlete, as he is currently one of the best triathletes in the world. He recently won an Olympic gold medal in Tokyo this summer as well as holds the records in the 70.3 and the 140.6 distances. 

Hector Leonardo Paez is another well known sponsored athlete, as he is a previous world champion XC mountain bike champion. 

Rahsaan Bahati is a former 10-time U.S. National Road Champion as well as the founder of the Bahati Foundation which works to build strong communities by providing underserved youth with bicycles. 

Some of the teams that Giant sponsor include: The Giant Off-Road Factory Team, The Black Foxes, and Team Onyx. Team Onyx is an all-black expedition racing team who have appeared on the show Worlds Toughest Race while competing in an Eco-Challenge.

In 2022 Giant entered a sponsorship with Team BikeExchange.

See also
 List of companies of Taiwan

References

External links

 

Cycle manufacturers of Taiwan
Companies listed on the Taiwan Stock Exchange
Mountain bike manufacturers
Taiwanese brands
Multinational companies headquartered in Taiwan
Vehicle manufacturing companies established in 1972
1972 establishments in Taiwan